The 2014 Victory Bowl was a college football bowl game played on November 22, 2014 at Barron Stadium in Rome, Georgia. The Crusaders cruised to a 42-16 win. North Greenville and Shorter were NCAA Division II schools, with Shorter playing its first year in Div. II after years in NAIA. Despite a 3-7 record entering the game, Shorter was selected for the bowl due to its high Massey Index rating. Although the teams had the same number of first downs (22) and comparable offensive yardage (North Greenville 411 to Shorter 365), the teams combined for several turnovers, including two Hawks fumbles which were recovered in the end zone for touchdowns by the Crusaders.

Game play

First quarter
North Greenville opened the scoring with a seven-play, 61-yard opening drive capped by Simeon Byrd's 14-yard touchdown run. Shorter responded with a 78-yard march of its own, with Eric Dodson tying the game at 7 on a one-yard TD run.

Second quarter
Shorter's defense forced three turnovers in the frame, but were only able to convert them into three points. Shorter's Santavious Bryant had an interception and a fumble, while Reggie Brown also recovered a Crusaders fumble. North Greenville's Quantel Mack also picked off a Shorter pass for four total turnovers during the quarter. After Brown's fumble recovery at Shorter's own 3-yard-line, the Hawks marched 78 yards before taking a 10-7 lead on a Kenny Langford 36-yard field goal at the end of the half.

Third quarter
The Crusaders took control quickly in the third quarter after Rashad Simmons recovered Shorter's fumbled kickoff return in the end zone, giving North Greenville a 14-10 lead. Then following a Hawks three-and-out, the Crusaders went 49 yards in about two minutes for another TD, increasing their lead to 21-10 on a Nelson Hughes-to-Mason Sanders seven-yard strike. The Hawks were able to regroup on their next series, driving almost 80 yards on 11 plays and pulling within 21-16 late in the quarter after a 10-yard Aaron Bryant touchdown run (the PAT failed).

Fourth quarter
Shorter was shut out in the final frame of the day. North Greenville scored three more times on a run by Byrd, a Robbie Brown 42-yard TD catch from Hughes and another end zone fumble recovery, this one by Charles Coleman, to make the final score 42-16.

References

Victory Bowl
Victory Bowl
North Greenville Crusaders football bowl games
Shorter Hawks football bowl games
Victory Bowl
Victory Bowl